Zakir Hussain is the name of:

 Zakir Husain (politician), an Indian politician and former president of India
 Zakir Hussain (actor), Bollywood actor
 Zakir Hussain (field hockey) (1934–2019), Pakistani field hockey player
 Zakir Hussain (footballer), Pakistani footballer at the 2003 South Asian Football Federation Gold Cup
 Zakir Hussain (Haryana politician), Indian politician
 Zakir Hussain (Hyderabad cricketer) (born 1964), Indian cricketer
 Zakir Hussain (musician) (born 1951), Indian classical tabla player
 Zakir Hussain (Pakistani cricketer), Pakistani cricketer who played for Pakistan Air Force

See also
 Zakir Hasan (disambiguation)
 Zakir Husain (politician) (1897–1969), 3rd President of India
 Zakir Husain (governor) (1898–1971), governor of East Pakistan
 Zakir Hossain (born 1977), cricketer